TWA Flight 891 was a Lockheed L-1649A Starliner that crashed not long after taking off from Milan Malpensa Airport on 26 June 1959. All 68 passengers and crew on board were killed.

Flight
On 26 June 1959, TWA Flight 891 departed Malpensa Airport in Milan, Italy, with a crew of 9 and 59 passengers on board. The flight had originated in Athens, Greece, and had stopped in Rome before flying on to Milan. The subsequent leg of the flight destination was to Paris' Orly Airport. When Flight 891 departed Milan, light rain was falling with a low overcast and a ceiling of around 2,000 feet, with visibility of approximately two miles (3.2 km). There were also thunderstorms in the area.

Twelve minutes after takeoff, the flight crew reported the aircraft was climbing through 10,000 feet. A few minutes after that, the Starliner suffered structural failure and broke up in mid-air. Everyone on board was killed. 

Flight 891 was the first fatal aviation accident involving a Lockheed Starliner. In terms of loss of life, it was also the worst air crash of 1959.

Cause
On 24 November 1960, an Italian inquiry board announced its finding that a lightning strike had brought down Flight 891. "The breaking-up in flight was due to the explosion of the fuel vapors contained in tank #7, followed immediately by either an explosion of pressure or a further explosion in tank #6. In the absence of other significant concrete evidence, taking into account the stormy weather conditions, with frequent electric discharges, existing in the area at the time of the crash, it may be assumed that the explosion of the fuel vapors contained in tank #7 was set off, through the outlet pipes, by igniting of the gasoline vapors issuing from these pipes as a consequence of static electricity discharges (streamer corona) which developed on the vent outlets."

See also
Pan Am Flight 214, another crash caused by lightning

References

External links

Website dedicated to the plane crash of Olgiate Olona of June 26, 1959 (TWA Flight 891).

Aviation accidents and incidents in 1959
Aviation accidents and incidents in Italy
Accidents and incidents involving the Lockheed Starliner
Airliner accidents and incidents involving in-flight explosions
Airliner accidents and incidents caused by lightning strikes
891
1959 in Italy
1959 meteorology